Esthelda “Stell” Ramona Parker Selby is an American politician and educator, and the State Representative for Sussex County, in the Delaware House of Representatives, representing the 20th district. Prior to her election, Parker Selby worked as a teacher and academic administrator in the Cape Henlopen School District before serving on the Cape Henlopen School Board. In November 2022, she was elected to the Delaware State House.

Biography 
Esthelda Parker Selby was born in Milford, Delaware, the daughter of the late Violet Ramona Parker and the late Denver B. Parker. Parker Selby attended elementary school at the segregated Milton School #196-C,  and high school at the William C. Jason Comprehensive High School in Georgetown, Delaware. Upon graduation, Parker Selby attended Delaware State University, where she received her BA in Sociology with a minor in Education, later earning a Master of Education at the University of Delaware in Education and Public-School Administration. 

In 1970, Selby was hired as a full-time teacher in the newly formed Cape Henlopen School District. During her career, Selby served as an Administrative Intern at Shields Elementary, as well as Assistant Principal and Principal in Rehoboth Elementary School, Cape Henlopen High School and at Booker T. Washington Elementary School in the Capital School District. She served as an Adjunct Professor at Delaware State University for several years. Prior to retirement, Selby served as a District level Administrator in the Departments of Human Resources and Community Services, Mentoring and School Climate Issues in the Cape Henlopen School District. After retirement, Parker Selby continued to work with Delaware State University, becoming the Director of Student Teaching for the Dover campus, and later Director of their Georgetown Campus site. Selby also served as a Student-Teacher Adviser for Wilmington University.

Political life
In the 1970s, Selby was appointed by Governor Pete duPont to serve on the First State Testing Committee.

In 1999, Parker Selby testified before the United States Joint Finance Committee about the Saving for Education Through Tax Sheltered Plans” initiative. In 2002, she entered the 19th Senatorial race against incumbent Senator Thurman Adams, Jr.. After losing that race, she said that she would return someday to the political arena and try for another office, and entered the State Treasurer’s race against incumbent Jack Markell in 2006. Despite losing the race against Markell, Selby was elected Councilwoman, and later Vice Mayor of the Town of Milton through April 2017. 

Parker Selby has received numerous awards, honors and recognitions, to include the YMCA Black Achiever Award, the Sussex County Dr. Martin Luther King, Jr. Community Award, the Delaware Principal Academy Service Award, the University Presidents’ Award, Thurgood Marshall Outstanding Alumni Award and the DSU Sussex County Alumni Chapter Award for Outstanding Community Service.

References 

Place of birth missing (living people)
Year of birth missing (living people)
Living people
Democratic Party members of the Delaware House of Representatives
21st-century American politicians
Delaware State University alumni
University of Delaware alumni
People from Milford, Delaware
African-American women